The National Agrarian Opposition (NAE) was a minor political party in Hungary during the 1930s. Affiliated with the National Independence Kossuth Party, it ran only in Hódmezővásárhely.

History
The party first contested national elections in 1931 as the Agro-Democratic Party, winning a single seat in the parliamentary elections that year. For the 1935 elections it ran as the "National Agrarian Opposition", again winning a single seat. Thereafter the party did not contest any further elections.

References

Defunct political parties in Hungary